La Manga Cup is a winter football tournament played in La Manga Club, La Manga del Mar Menor (Murcia, Spain). Usual participants are clubs from countries with a summer football season: Sweden, Finland, Denmark, Norway, Russia, Ukraine, and the United States and Canada. The first cup was played in 1999 and was won by Rosenborg, who are the most successful team to date with three wins.

Winners

Performance

Performance by club

Performance by country

External links
History of tournament
Results (1999-2009)
Results (2010-2012)
La Manga Cup Standings 2000-2013
La Manga Cup Live Scores